The McBryde–Screws–Tyson House, also known as the Tyson House, is a historic Greek Revival style house in Montgomery, Alabama.  The two-story frame building was completed in 1832 and the Greek Revival facade added in 1855.  It was added to the National Register of Historic Places on November 28, 1980.

 

 

More photos from the Historic American Buildings Survey available:
https://www.loc.gov/resource/hhh.al0654.photos?st=gallery

References

Houses on the National Register of Historic Places in Alabama
Houses completed in 1832
Greek Revival houses in Alabama
Houses in Montgomery, Alabama
National Register of Historic Places in Montgomery, Alabama